Riding High is a 1981 British drama film directed by Ross Cramer and starring Eddie Kidd, Irene Handl and Murray Salem. The screenplay concerns a bored young motorcycle messenger who begins training to take part in a major biking competition.

Cast
 Eddie Kidd ...  Dave Munday
 Irene Handl ...  Gran
 Murray Salem ...  Marvin Ravensdorf
 Marella Oppenheim ...  Zoro
 Bill Mitchell ...  Judas S. Chariot
 Zoot Money ...  Dorking
 Paul Humpoletz ...  Gelt
 Lynda Bellingham ...  Miss Mott
 Daniel Peacock ...  Clerk
 Owen Whittaker ...  Astro
 Claire Toeman ...  Jem
 Ken Kitson ...  The Halifax Hellcat
 Vivienne McKone ...  Minty
 Saiward Green ...  Mol
 Peter Whitman ...  Fred Turkey
 Angela Crow ...  Beryl
 April Olrich ...  Dorking's Bird
 Oliver Smith ...  Burt Ganja
 Patricia Hodge ...  Miss Hemmings
 Alan Dudley ...  Mr. Willow
 Allan Warren ...  Photographer
 Diana Weston ...  Receptionist

References

External links

 

1981 films
1981 drama films
British drama films
1980s English-language films
1980s British films